Jamīl ibn 'Abd Allāh ibn Ma'mar al-'Udhrī (d.701 CE), also known as Jamil Buthayna, was a classical Arabic love poet. He belonged to the Banu 'Udhra tribe which was renowned for its poetic tradition of chaste love.

See also
 Kuthayyir

References

701 deaths
Poets from the Umayyad Caliphate
Year of birth unknown
Love in Arabic literature
7th-century Arabs
8th-century Arabs